Chris Omar Johnson (born August 8, 1971) is a Jamaican-born boxer, who won a middleweight bronze medal at the 1992 Summer Olympics for Canada. He won the middleweight gold medal at the 1990 Commonwealth Games.  He was inducted into Boxing Canada’s Hall of Fame, Class of 2019.

Johnson was raised in Kitchener, Ontario, Canada with his three brothers, Greg, Wayne, and Kevin, and 2 sisters, Angelina, and Necoal.

Johnson trained IBF Junior Featherweight World Champion, Steve "The Canadian Kid" Molitor, in addition to notable boxers such as Andrew Singh Kooner, and Natalie "Too Bad" Brown. In 2014, the Toronto Star profiled Michael Brandon, one of his boxers.

Professional boxing record

|-
|align="center" colspan=8|26 Wins (14 knockouts, 12 decisions), 3 Losses (2 knockouts, 1 decision), 1 Draw
|-
| align="center" style="border-style: none none solid solid; background: #e3e3e3"|Result
| align="center" style="border-style: none none solid solid; background: #e3e3e3"|Record
| align="center" style="border-style: none none solid solid; background: #e3e3e3"|Opponent
| align="center" style="border-style: none none solid solid; background: #e3e3e3"|Type
| align="center" style="border-style: none none solid solid; background: #e3e3e3"|Round
| align="center" style="border-style: none none solid solid; background: #e3e3e3"|Date
| align="center" style="border-style: none none solid solid; background: #e3e3e3"|Location
| align="center" style="border-style: none none solid solid; background: #e3e3e3"|Notes
|-align=center
|Loss
|
|align=left| Antonio Tarver
|KO
|10
|03/08/2001
|align=left| Yakama Legends Casino, Toppenish, Washington, United States
|align=left|
|-
|Loss
|
|align=left| "Sweet" Reggie Johnson
|UD
|12
|05/01/2001
|align=left| Grand Casino Biloxi, Biloxi, Mississippi, United States
|align=left|
|-
|Win
|
|align=left| Franklin Edmondson
|UD
|8
|25/11/2000
|align=left| Roseland Ballroom, Taunton, Massachusetts, United States
|align=left|
|-
|Win
|
|align=left| Greg Wright
|UD
|12
|14/07/2000
|align=left| Hampton Beach Casino Ballroom, Hampton Beach, New Hampshire, United States
|align=left|
|-
|Win
|
|align=left| Tyler Hughes
|TKO
|5
|07/03/2000
|align=left| Casino Windsor, Windsor, Ontario, Canada
|align=left|
|-
|Win
|
|align=left| Availeo Slate
|TKO
|2
|05/11/1999
|align=left| Hyatt Regency, Tampa, Florida, United States
|align=left|
|-
|Win
|
|align=left| Cecil McKenzie
|TKO
|3
|21/08/1998
|align=left| The Orleans, Las Vegas, Nevada, United States
|align=left|
|-
|Win
|
|align=left| Napoleon Pitt
|TKO
|1
|28/03/1998
|align=left| Boardwalk Hall, Atlantic City, New Jersey, United States
|align=left|
|-
|Win
|
|align=left| Melvin Wynn
|TKO
|5
|20/11/1997
|align=left| Doraville, Georgia, United States
|align=left|
|-
|Draw
|
|align=left| Ernest Mateen
|TD
|3
|03/10/1997
|align=left| Tropicana Hotel & Casino, Atlantic City, New Jersey, United States
|align=left|
|-
|Win
|
|align=left| James "The Giant Peach" Mullins
|TKO
|2
|09/09/1997
|align=left| Nashville, Tennessee, United States
|align=left|
|-
|Loss
|
|align=left| Herol Graham
|TKO
|8
|12/07/1997
|align=left| Olympia, Kensington, London, United Kingdom
|align=left|
|-
|Win
|
|align=left| Milan Konecny
|PTS
|8
|28/04/1997
|align=left| Ice arena, Hull, Yorkshire, United Kingdom
|align=left|
|-
|Win
|
|align=left| Paul Wesley
|KO
|2
|25/03/1997
|align=left| Broadway Theatre, Catford, Lewisham, London, England, United Kingdom
|align=left|
|-
|Win
|
|align=left| Antwun Echols
|MD
|10
|11/10/1996
|align=left| International Plaza Hotel, Toronto, Ontario, Canada
|align=left|
|-
|Win
|
|align=left| Darren Ashton
|TKO
|1
|09/07/1996
|align=left| York Hall, Bethnal Green, London, United Kingdom
|align=left|
|-
|Win
|
|align=left| Darron Griffiths
|RTD
|3
|02/04/1996
|align=left| Elephant & Castle, Southwark, London, United Kingdom
|align=left|
|-
|Win
|
|align=left| Rocky Gannon
|UD
|8
|18/07/1995
|align=left| IMA Sports Arena, Flint, Michigan, United States
|align=left|
|-
|Win
|
|align=left| Chris Sande
|TKO
|2
|22/04/1995
|align=left| MGM Grand Garden Arena, Las Vegas, Nevada, United States
|align=left|
|-
|Win
|
|align=left| Asluddin Umarov
|UD
|4
|18/02/1995
|align=left| MGM Grand Garden Arena, Las Vegas, Nevada, United States
|align=left|
|-
|Win
|
|align=left| Eric French
|PTS
|8
|26/01/1995
|align=left| Rosemont, Illinois, United States
|align=left|
|-
|Win
|
|align=left| Tony Golden
|PTS
|6
|20/12/1994
|align=left| Rosemont, Illinois, United States
|align=left|
|-
|Win
|
|align=left| Roman Santos
|PTS
|6
|18/11/1994
|align=left| MGM Grand Garden Arena, Las Vegas, Nevada, United States
|align=left|
|-
|Win
|
|align=left| Apolinar Hernandez
|UD
|4
|13/02/1994
|align=left| Bally's Park Place, Atlantic City, New Jersey, United States
|align=left|
|-
|Win
|
|align=left| Caseny Truesdale
|TKO
|3
|10/11/1993
|align=left| Atlantic City, New Jersey, United States
|align=left|
|-
|Win
|
|align=left| Roy Payne
|PTS
|4
|06/10/1993
|align=left| Harrah's Marina, Atlantic City, New Jersey, United States
|align=left|
|-
|Win
|
|align=left| Vernon Hicks
|TKO
|2
|22/07/1993
|align=left| Bay St. Louis, Mississippi, United States
|align=left|
|-
|Win
|
|align=left| Shaun Holder
|TKO
|2
|13/05/1993
|align=left| Atlantic City, New Jersey, United States
|align=left|
|-
|Win
|
|align=left| Quirino Garcia
|PTS
|4
|24/04/1993
|align=left| The Aladdin, Las Vegas, Nevada, United States
|align=left|
|-
|Win
|
|align=left| Berry Butler
|TKO
|3
|28/02/1993
|align=left| Trump Castle, Atlantic City, New Jersey, United States
|align=left|
|}

1992 Summer Olympics results 
Defeated Mohamed Siluvangi (Zaire) TKO 3
Defeated Stefan Trendafilov (Bulgaria) TKO 1
Lost to Chris Byrd (USA) 3-17

References

External links
 
 Sparring for student success 2008 Toronto Star article on pilot program for middle school students at Toronto District School Board's Charles H. Best Middle School
 
 

1971 births
Black Canadian boxers
Jamaican emigrants to Canada
Boxers at the 1990 Commonwealth Games
Boxers at the 1991 Pan American Games
Boxers at the 1992 Summer Olympics
Olympic boxers of Canada
Canadian boxing trainers
Olympic bronze medalists for Canada
Commonwealth Games gold medallists for Canada
Sportspeople from Kitchener, Ontario
People from Manchester Parish
Olympic medalists in boxing
Living people
Canadian male boxers
AIBA World Boxing Championships medalists
Medalists at the 1992 Summer Olympics
Pan American Games silver medalists for Canada
Commonwealth Games medallists in boxing
Pan American Games medalists in boxing
Middleweight boxers
Medalists at the 1991 Pan American Games
Medallists at the 1990 Commonwealth Games